Beirut bombings may refer to the following bombings that have occurred in Beirut:

 1981 Iraqi embassy bombing in Beirut
 1982 Beirut bombing
 1983 United States embassy bombing in Beirut
 1983 Beirut barracks bombing
 1984 United States embassy annex bombing in Beirut
 1985 Beirut car bombings
 October 2012 Beirut bombing
 July 2013 Beirut bombing
 August 2013 Beirut bombing
 2013 Iranian embassy bombing in Beirut
 Assassination of Mohamad Chatah
 2015 Beirut bombings

See also 
 Beirut attack (disambiguation)
 Beirut explosion
 Beirut (film)
 Beirut Memorial
 Lebanon bombings and assassinations (2004–present)
 List of major terrorist incidents

Explosions in Beirut